Gorka Laborda García (born 13 April 1989) is a Spanish footballer who plays for CD Izarra as a forward.

Football career
Laborda finished his formation with local SD Lagunak, and made his senior debuts with Benidorm CF in the 2008–09 season. In 2010, he left the club and joined Athletic Bilbao, being assigned to the reserves also in Segunda División B. However, after appearing sparingly in his first season and being left out of the squad in the second, he was released.

In July 2012 Laborda signed for another club in the third level, Peña Sport FC. On 7 January 2013 he joined Deportivo Alavés, and achieved promotion at the end of the campaign, scoring five goals in 17 matches.

On 16 August 2013 Laborda played his first professional match, in a 0–1 away defeat against Girona FC in the Segunda División championship. On 30 December, he was deemed surplus to requirements and was subsequently released.

Laborda remained as a free agent until July 2016, signing for UD Mutilvera in the third division.

References

External links

1989 births
Living people
Footballers from Pamplona
Spanish footballers
Association football forwards
Segunda División players
Segunda División B players
Benidorm CF footballers
Bilbao Athletic footballers
Peña Sport FC footballers
Deportivo Alavés players
UD Mutilvera players
CD Izarra footballers